Roller Sports were contested at the 2017 Summer Universiade from August 21 to 26 at the Yingfeng Riverside Park Roller Sports Rink (A) and Ren'ai Road, Taipei City, (start: Ketagalan Boulevard) for the marathon in Taipei, Taiwan.

Participating nations

Medal summary

Medal table

Men's events

Women's events

References

External links 
2017 Summer Universiade – Roller Sports
Result book – Roller Sports

Roller sports
Roller sports at the Summer Universiade
2017 in roller sports